IC 4406, sometimes known as the Retina Nebula, is a planetary nebula near the western border of the constellation Lupus, the Wolf. It has dust clouds and has the shape of a torus. Despite this, it looks somewhat rectangular because it is seen from its side as viewed from Earth, almost in the plane of its equator.

Structure
IC 4406 is bipolar and appears to be a prolate spheroid with strong concentrations of material in its equator. This kind of structure is a natural product of a bipolar model.  The knots of IC 4406 have a "lacy" appearance and have no ordered symmetry towards the central star.  The knots have no tails.  None of the features have bright edges. At least 5 faint ring-like structures, seen as arcs north and south of the main nebula, have been detected in Very Large Telescope observations.

The central star of the planetary nebula has a spectral type similar to that of a Wolf–Rayet star. An analysis of Gaia data suggests that it may be a binary system.

Gallery

See also
 Planetary nebula

References

External links 
 

Planetary nebulae
Lupus (constellation)
4406